Deluxe Records is the record label of German hip-hop artist Samy Deluxe.

History 

After Hamburg label Eimsbush went bankrupt in 2003, Dynamite Deluxe member Samy Deluxe founded a new label within the same year called Deluxe Records. At first, it was part of Capitol Records which is owned by EMI. The first artists besides Samy Deluxe himself were the rap group Headliners and rapper Illo. To make them known and to help distributing mixtapes and merchandise, Samy founded the branch Hamburgs Finest. Starting off on the internet, Hamburgs Finest Mixtape Vol. 4 - So Deluxe So Glorious was the first mixtape to retail. 2005 compilation album Deluxe Records - Let's Go, together with the Let's-Go-Tour, helped introducing the label to further audience.

In 2006, five other artists signed contracts with Deluxe Records. They were Munich rapper Ali A$, Ruhr Area artists Manuellsen and Snaga & Pillath as well as Cologne rapper Blade.

On February 12, 2007, an internet show called Deluxe Zoom started broadcasting live performances and backstage footage of the label's artists. The episodes appeared at irregular intervals and today, no more episodes will be produced.

In July 2007, Deluxe Records broke away from Capitol Records/ EMI and is now an independent label distributed over Groove Attack. Solely Same Deluxe's albums will be released over Capitol Records. In December 2007, rapper TUA, formerly signed on Royal Bunker, joined Deluxe Records. On March 14, 2008, Snaga & Pillath broke up with Deluxe Records due to misunderstandings relating to business. Manuellsen also left the label in 2008. Illo, who quit his rap career, and Blade also followed in the same year.

As of now, Deluxe Records consists of Samy Deluxe, Ali A$ and TUA. In December 2008, they released a sampler with the title Liebling, ich habe das Label geschrumpft. It is translated Honey, I Shrunk the Label, which obviously is a parody of the motion picture Honey, I Shrunk the Kids due to the cut of signed artists on the label.

Releases

Albums

Singles 

 2005: Samy Deluxe - Let's Go
 2006: Headliners - Sag ihnen Bescheid
 2006: Manuellsen - Meine Zeit/True Story ("My Time/")
 2006: Manuellsen - Dear Christin
 2007: Snaga & Pillath - R.U.H.R.P.O.T.T. (feat. Manuellsen)
 2007: Illo - Sie ist... (feat. Emory) ("She is...")
 2007: Illo - Oh mein Gott (feat. Emory) ("Oh My God")
 2007: Snaga & Pillath - Einen Tag (feat. Manuellsen)
 2007: Manuellsen - Vor-Bye
 2008: Tua - Inzwischen (EP)
 2008: Sugon Sia - More Than 2 Cocks inz de Mouf
 2008: Ali As - Ich bin ein Star, holt mich hier raus

See also 
 List of record labels

German record labels
Record labels established in 2003